Izačić (Serbian Cyrillic: Изачић) is a village in Bosnia and Herzegovina.

Izacic is a part of Federation of Bosnia and Herzegovina. It shares a border with Croatia to the east . The eastern lower part mainly lies in a valley between hill with sua b-village called Mušići, below mountain Plješevica, and a hill Prtošanj, with sta ream between them and springs. The area is rich with natural springs and drinking water. The southern upper part lies on a flat area, ich with agricultural goods.

As a last stop in Bosnia for travelers to Croatia, it has a great economy for a small village. This village is most famous for being the site of the military Operation Tiger in 1994.

Demographics 
According to the 2013 census, its population was 1,008.

References

Populated places in Bihać